2,6-dihydroxypseudooxynicotine hydrolase is an enzyme with systematic name 1-(2,6-dihydroxypyridin-3-yl)-4-(methylamino)butan-1-one hydrolase. This enzyme catalyses the following chemical reaction

 1-(2,6-dihydroxypyridin-3-yl)-4-(methylamino)butan-1-one + H2O  2,6-dihydroxypyridine + 4-methylaminobutanoate

The enzyme is present in the soil bacterium Arthrobacter nicotinovorans.

References

External links 
 

EC 3.7.1